Steady Mobb'n was an American hip hop  duo composed of Crooked Eye and Billy Bathgate, from the Ghost Town section of West Oakland. The duo were formally signed to No Limit Records & Bomb Shelter Entertainment in the late 1990s.

Music career
In 1995, Steady Mobb'n released a cassette EP titled Blood Money. Two years later the duo joined rapper/entrepreneur Master P's No Limit Records, and collaborated with Master P on the single "If I Could Change", which was produced by No Limit Records in-house producer DJ Daryl and served as the first single from the I'm Bout It soundtrack. Steady Mobb'n's debut album, Pre-Meditated Drama, was released in May 1997 and gave them their biggest chart success, peaking at #29 on the Billboard Hot 200 and #6 on Top R&B/Hip-Hop Albums. However, after the commercial disappointment of their 1998 follow-up, Black Mafia (#82 on the Billboard 200, #19 on Top R&B/Hip-Hop Albums), Steady Mobb'n departed No Limit.

In 2001, Steady Mobb'n reunited with No Limit producer DJ Daryl and signed with his label Bomb Shelter Music. Their third album, Crime Buddies, was released that year but failed to chart. In 2003, they released their fourth and final record, the non-charting Espionage, on the independent Big Body Entertainment. The duo split up thereafter.

Solo careers
Billy Bathgate changed his name to Bavgate and signed with Thizz Entertainment.

As of October 2019, Crooked Eye (real name Aaron Edmond) was living in a homeless encampment in Oakland, California.

Discography

Studio albums

Extended plays

Soundtrack albums

Compilation albums

Singles

As lead artist

As featured artist

Collaboration singles

References

External links

African-American musical groups
American musical duos
Hip hop duos
No Limit Records artists
Hip hop groups from California
Gangsta rap groups
Musical groups from Oakland, California